Sameer Sharma (3 May 1976 – 4 August 2020) was an Indian television actor. He was best known for his portrayal of Shaurya Maheshwari in Yeh Rishtey Hain Pyaar Ke, Brij in Jyoti, Nitin in Dil Kya Chahta Hai and Krishna Agarwal in Kahaani Ghar Ghar Kii.

Early life
Sharma hailed from Delhi, and moved to Bangalore after completing his education. He worked for an advertising agency, an IT company and for Radio City in Bangalore.

Career
Sharma moved to Mumbai to pursue his career in acting. He made his television debut with STAR One's Dil Kya Chahta Hai portraying Nitin, following which, he played Krishna Agarwal in Kahaani Ghar Ghar Ki.

On SAB TV, he played Captain Naveen Singh Ahluwalia in Left Right Left and Mannat (Mannu) in Four. He also portrayed a hockey coach and an aggressive lover in the Veeranwali serial on 9X.

Later, Sharma played a negative role as Brijesh in NDTV Imagine's Jyoti. He also landed the lead role opposite Reena Kapoor in Sahara One's longest running show and Rajshri Productions show, Woh Rehne Waali Mehlon Ki as Rishabh Johri.

He also appeared in the television show Iss Pyaar Ko Kya Naam Doon? Ek Baar Phir

Sharma has also played a supporting role in the 2014 Bollywood film Hasee Toh Phasee. He played the role of Shaurya Maheshwari in Yeh Rishtey Hain Pyaar Ke.

Apart from acting, Sharma had been a part of several ad campaigns and modeling assignments.

Death
Sharma was found dead at the age of 44 at his residence in Malad West, Mumbai on the night of 5 August 2020. The police said on 6 August, "Looking at body's condition, it's suspected that he died by hanging two days back". His body was found hanging from his kitchen by a security guard. No suicide note was found.

Filmography

Films

Television

Web series

References

External links
 

Year of birth missing
1970s births
2020 deaths
Indian male film actors
Indian male television actors
Male actors from Delhi
2020 suicides
Suicides by hanging in India
Artists who committed suicide